Urmilaben Chimanbhai Patel was an Indian politician. She was a Member of Parliament, representing Gujarat in the Rajya Sabha the upper house of India's Parliament as a member of the Indian National Congress.

References

1932 births
2016 deaths
Rajya Sabha members from Gujarat
Indian National Congress politicians from Gujarat
Women in Gujarat politics
Women members of the Rajya Sabha